Stanytsia Luhanska is an urban-type settlement on the banks of the Seversky Donets River in the Shchastia Raion of Luhansk Oblast in eastern Ukraine. Population: . It is situated 20 km northeast of Luhansk. Prior to 2020, it was the administrative centre of the former Stanytsia-Luhanska Raion.

History
Stanytsia Luhanska is one of two local foundations of the Don Cossacks in today's Ukraine.

During World War II, in 1942–1943, the German occupiers operated a Nazi prison in the settlement.

Russo-Ukrainian war

Starting Mid-April 2014 pro-Russian separatists captured several towns in the Donbass region, including Stanytsia Luhanska.

On 2 July 2014 unspecified planes attacked the village and the village of Kondrashovka. The Ukrainian army denied the airstrike and blamed the damage on faulty shelling by the separatists. There is also a version that the air strike was caused by a Russian aircraft in order to discredit the Ukrainian army by accusing it of bombing residential areas.

On 21 August 2014, Ukrainian forces reportedly were clearing Stanytsia Luhanska from the pro-Russian separatists. The settlement remained under control of the Ukrainian authorities. It became situated on the frontline with forces representing the Luhansk People's Republic and became regularly the victim of shelling. An early 2017 agreement between the Ukrainian army and the separatist forces of the war in Donbass on the disengagement of forces in Stanytsia Luhanska failed to materialise. On 17 February 2022, the rebels shelled the town and a missile hit a school, injuring 3 people. They also left half of the town without electricity. On February 26, the settlement was occupied by Russian Ground Forces as part of the 2022 Russian invasion of Ukraine.

Demographics
Native language as of the Ukrainian Census of 2001:
Russian  92.4%
Ukrainian  6.2%
Romani  0.2%
Armenian  0.2%
Belarusian  0.1%

References 

Urban-type settlements in Shchastia Raion
Shchastia Raion
Don Host Oblast